"Soft Parachutes" is a song written by Paul Simon and performed in his 1980 film One-Trick Pony. The song is reminiscent of his early material, which covered issues such as war and the civil rights movement. The song was written for the film, in which Simon's character, Jonah Levin, is asked to play his anti-war ballad "Soft Parachutes" at a reunion show of 1960s stars. The song is available on the soundtrack reissue of One-Trick Pony.

It features only a chorus (sung twice) and one verse.

Paul Simon songs
Songs written by Paul Simon